Gdańsk Port Północny is a freight railway station in Gdańsk, Poland.

Lines crossing the station

Port Polnocny